The CNN Center in Atlanta, Georgia, is the international headquarters of the Cable News Network (CNN). The main newsrooms and studios for several of CNN's news channels are located in the building.  The facility's commercial office space is occupied by various units of the former Turner Broadcasting System, now part of Warner Bros. Discovery. The CNN Center is located in downtown Atlanta adjacent to Centennial Olympic Park. The One CNN Center office building was acquired by CP Group in 2021.

History

1970s and 1980s
The building now occupied by the CNN Center opened in 1976 as the Omni Complex, a development by Cousins Properties. The Omni Coliseum, an NBA and NHL arena directly connected to the Omni Complex, had opened three years earlier, on October 14, 1972. The Omni Complex office building was largely vacant until CNN moved its headquarters there in 1987 from its Midtown Atlanta site (old home of the Progressive Club on 1050 Techwood Drive and home to Turner Broadcasting System). 

Over the years, the building had provided office space to various business tenants, as well as foreign consulates. The main floor featured an indoor ice rink, as well as a small number of restaurants and a Gold Mine video arcade. Sid and Marty Krofft built an indoor amusement park called The World of Sid and Marty Krofft, inspired by the creations of these popular children's television producers. Opened in 1976, it was the first indoor theme park in the United States, but it closed within six months. The complex also featured a multi-screen movie theater. For years, the theater offered showings of the 1939 film Gone with the Wind, which Ted Turner called "The greatest movie ever made". 

During renovations to install a new newsroom for CNN's website operations, the movie theater was replaced. The ice skating rink was filled in and replaced by a mosaic map of the world (the map featured brass markers indicating the locations of CNN bureaus around the world). Prior to moving to the new location, CNN and Headline News were based in a former country club on Techwood Drive in Midtown Atlanta. They shared the facility with WTBS. Since the late 20th century, this facility has served as the campus for nearly all other Turner networks and Turner Studios. During the 1990s, the mansion facade was used as the logo for Turner's theatrical and home video arms. 

When CNN networks moved to the CNN Center on July 13, 1987, CNN Headline News (now known as HLN) was the first network to broadcast a show from it. Their sister channel started live programming at 6am ET of that day.

1990s

On May 11, 1997, the Omni Coliseum closed. Its replacement, Philips Arena (now State Farm Arena), broke ground on June 5, 1997. The Omni Coliseum was imploded on July 26, 1997, with the CNN Center taking on minor exterior window damage due to its close distance to the Omni Coliseum. Because of this, the CNN Center was expected to be damaged. Philips Arena opened on September 18, 1999.

2000s
On April 4, 2007, Arthur Mann, an employee at the Omni Hotel, shot and severely injured his ex-girlfriend Clara Riddles inside the CNN center. The adjacent CNN.com newsroom was evacuated shortly after the first shots were heard. Mann was confronted and shot by a Turner Security Officer, and both Riddles and Mann were taken to a nearby hospital for treatment. Riddles later died of her injuries. An autopsy showed that Riddles was shot three times by Mann. The motive of the shooting is unknown.

On March 14, 2008, an EF-2 tornado passed through downtown Atlanta, damaging the CNN Center and leaving water and dust in the upper floors. The ceiling of the atrium was also damaged, allowing water to pour in and partially flood the food court. CNN's library was damaged, although it was not immediately known how much of its archives were damaged. Numerous injuries and widespread damage were reported overall. The Omni Hotel, attached to the CNN Center, was evacuated as a precaution, and more than 400 rooms had to be emptied of occupancy for two weeks.

2010s
On June 13, 2014, a car crashed into the CNN Center, causing minor structural damage. The driver claimed to have fallen asleep at the wheel, and was charged with driving under the influence (DUI) and possession of marijuana.

Disinvestment from Omni Hotel
In 2016, the chief financial officer (CFO) Pascal Desroches of Turner said the company would divest its 50% stake in the center's Omni Hotel in favor of redeveloping its Techwood campus in Atlanta. This is where other Turner broadcast operations are based.

2020s

On May 29, 2020, the CNN Center became the scene of rioting in response to the murder of George Floyd in Minneapolis, Minnesota, four days earlier, as the building also houses a Zone 5 police precinct for the Atlanta Police Department. Rioters graffitied the CNN logo in the front of the building and caused property damage to the building's entrance glass curtain wall and APD vehicles; the front lobby was damaged, though protesters never breached into the core common area of the building, with the logo sign repainted shortly thereafter.

On June 29, 2020, exactly a month after the incident, WarnerMedia announced plans to sell the CNN Center. Once sold, WarnerMedia will continue to lease their existing space for several years until the Techwood WarnerMedia campus is expanded to accommodate CNN's Atlanta operations.

On November 21, 2020, a group of right-wing activists organized by the WalkAway campaign gathered in front of the CNN Center. In the 2020 presidential election, Joe Biden won the state's 16 electoral votes, the first Democrat to win the state since Bill Clinton in 1992. The protesters were inspired by unfounded claims of voter fraud.

On January 11, 2023, it was reported that CNN would be leaving the CNN Center before the end of 2023.

Features

The CNN Center also houses an Omni Hotel and features a large atrium food court frequented by local business employees, tourists, attendees at State Farm Arena, and Mercedes-Benz Stadium events, and conference attendees from the nearby Georgia World Congress Center. 

CNN's multi-channel output to the world is broadcast on large screens around the center. Studio tours are available and include demonstrations of technologies, such as Chroma key and teleprompters, as well as visits to viewing galleries overlooking the newsrooms and anchors of CNN International, HLN, CNN 10, and CNN en Español.

Built for the theme park that once occupied the building, it is part of the building's original structure, making it very hard to remove.

MARTA rail service is provided to the CNN Center at the Dome/GWCC/Philips Arena/CNN Center station. Access to the Red and Gold lines may be gained by a ten-fifteen minute walk to Peachtree Center Station.

List of tenants
 Arby's
 Atlanta Police Department
 AT&T Store
 BurgerFi
 Cartoon Network Store
 Chick-fil-A
 China Breeze
 CNN Store
 Dantanna's Downtown
 Dunkin' Donuts
 Fresh to Order
 Great Wraps
 McCormick & Schmick's Seafood Restaurants
 Moe's Southwest Grill
 Natural's Ice Cream, Yogurt & Smoothies
 Roman Delight
 Starbucks
 Subway
 TJ's Sandwiches
 U.S. Postal Store
 Wells Fargo Bank

References

External links

CNN.com website
CNN Center Studio Tour website
CNN Store
Omni Hotel at CNN Center

Mass media company headquarters in the United States
Mass media in Atlanta
Office buildings in Atlanta
CNN
Mass media museums in the United States
Telecommunications museums in the United States
Museums in Atlanta
Warner Bros. Discovery
Office buildings completed in 1976
1976 establishments in Georgia (U.S. state)
Brutalist architecture in Georgia (U.S. state)